"You Can Leave Your Hat On" is a song written by Randy Newman and appearing on his 1972 album Sail Away.

According to a retrospective AllMusic review by Mark Deming, the song is a "potent mid-tempo rock tune" and a "witty and willfully perverse bit of erotic absurdity". Newman later admitted the song was, "too low for me to sing it. I can't rock it too hard, which maybe I should have...or maybe not."

Joe Cocker version

Joe Cocker recorded "You Can Leave Your Hat On" for his 1986 album Cocker. Released as a single, Cocker's version peaked at No. 35 on Billboard Hot Mainstream Rock Tracks,  and it was featured in the 1986 Adrian Lyne film 9½ Weeks during the striptease scene. It was also a popular single in Australia (where the film was immensely popular), reaching Number 23.

A music video was released which features footage of the striptease scene from 9½ Weeks and scenes with Cocker and his band performing the song. In some countries, the song itself is considered a striptease anthem, and still being used by strippers.

Personnel
 Joe Cocker – lead vocals
 Richie Zito – production, guitar
 Arthur Barrow – piano, bass
 Mike Baird – drums
 Dick Hyde – trombone
 Joel Peskin – saxophone
 Steve Madaio – trumpet
 Elisecia Wright – backing vocals
 Julia Tillman Waters – backing vocals
 Maxine Green – backing vocals

Other cover versions
Etta James covered the song in a 1974 single, published by Chess Records and produced by Gabriel Mekler.

Three Dog Night covered the song in a 1975 single, published by ABC and produced by Jimmy Ienner.

Merl Saunders and Aunt Monk covered it in 1976 on their album You Can Leave Your Hat On. Here for the first time that specific brass arrangement was used, which Joe Cocker used in his more successful cover 10 years later.

Tom Jones covered the song for the soundtrack of the 1997 British film The Full Monty and is included in the subsequent 2013 play of the same name. As a medley with Hot Chocolate's "You Sexy Thing" and Donna Summer's	"Hot Stuff", the track reached Number 62 in the UK Singles Chart in 1998, under the title "The Full Monty - Monster Mix".

American country music singer Ty Herndon covered the song on his 1999 album, Steam. Herndon's version reached No. 72 on the Billboard Hot Country Singles & Tracks chart from unsolicited airplay and was included on his 2002 compilation, This Is Ty Herndon: Greatest Hits.

References

External links
 "You Can Leave Your Hat On" review on AllMusic

1972 songs
1986 singles
Songs written by Randy Newman
Randy Newman songs
Joe Cocker songs
Ty Herndon songs
Three Dog Night songs
Song recordings produced by Lenny Waronker
Song recordings produced by Russ Titelman
EMI Records singles
Reprise Records singles
Tom Jones (singer) songs